Shirley Elaine Strong (née Strong, born 18 November 1958) is a British former athlete who competed mainly in the 100 metres hurdles. In this event, she won a silver medal at the 1984 Olympic Games in Los Angeles, a gold medal at the 1982 Commonwealth Games, and a silver medal at the 1978 Commonwealth Games. She also held the British record from 1980 to 1988.

Personal life
Strong was born in Cuddington, Cheshire and remained in the village throughout her career. She has two daughters and lives in Holmes Chapel, Cheshire.

Career 
Strong began her national career in 1977 with second placings in the 100 metres hurdles at both the AAA Championships and the UK Athletics Championships, achieving second place again in 1978 at both championships. Between 1979 and 1984 she won six consecutive golds at the AAA Championships and was UK Champion in 1979, 1980 and 1983. She studied at Northwich Grammar School For Girls, now known as The County High School, Leftwich.

Strong's first major championship was the 1978 Commonwealth Games, in Edmonton, Canada where she got the silver medal. She went on to improve on that in the 1982 Commonwealth Games in Brisbane Australia, by getting the gold medal.

Strong achieved a creditable fifth place at the 1983 World Championships with a wind-assisted time of 12.78 seconds, Great Britain's highest placing in the event until Tiffany Porter finished in fourth place in 2011.

With the eastern European countries absent through boycott at the 1984 Olympics in Los Angeles, Strong went into the 100 metres hurdles event as favourite. However, in the final Benita Fitzgerald-Brown of the United States ran the race of her life to take gold in 12.84 seconds, 0.04 seconds faster than the Briton.

In the years following Los Angeles, Strong was frequently troubled by problems with her achilles tendon and failed to qualify for the 1986 Commonwealth Games. She did earn selection for the European Championships later that year, but withdrew from the team. After competing in the 1987 indoor season she retired from athletics.

Popularity 
At the height of her career Strong was among the most popular athletes in the UK among a public who regarded her as "one of us", and even admitted to having an occasional cigarette after a race.

Personal bests
60 metres hurdles  – 8.11sec Cosford, UK 11 March 1984
100 metres hurdles – 12.87sec Zurich, SUI 24 August 1983 – British record 1983–88

Note: Strong twice ran 12.78sec, first in Brisbane (8 October 1982 ) with a following wind of +4.5, then in Helsinki (13 August 1983) with a following wind of +2.4. Any performance achieved with a following wind of more than +2.0 m/s is regarded as wind-assisted and does not count for record purposes.

Achievements
 6 Times AAAs (of England) National 100 m Hurdles Champion 1979, 80, 81, 82, 83, 84 ( 2nd in 77, 78 )
 3 Times UK National 100 m Hurdles Champion 1979, 80, 83 ( 2nd in 77, 78 )

References

 

1958 births
Living people
People from Cuddington, Eddisbury
People from Holmes Chapel
English female hurdlers
Olympic athletes of Great Britain
Olympic silver medallists for Great Britain
Athletes (track and field) at the 1980 Summer Olympics
Athletes (track and field) at the 1984 Summer Olympics
Commonwealth Games gold medallists for England
Commonwealth Games medallists in athletics
Athletes (track and field) at the 1978 Commonwealth Games
Athletes (track and field) at the 1982 Commonwealth Games
World Athletics Championships athletes for Great Britain
Sportspeople from Cheshire
Medalists at the 1984 Summer Olympics
Commonwealth Games silver medallists for England
Olympic silver medalists in athletics (track and field)
Medallists at the 1978 Commonwealth Games
Medallists at the 1982 Commonwealth Games